The 1994–95 Arkansas Razorbacks men's basketball team represented the University of Arkansas as a member of the Southeastern Conference during the 1994–95 NCAA Division I men's basketball season. The team was led by head coach Nolan Richardson, and played its home games at the Bud Walton Arena in Fayetteville, Arkansas.

The Razorbacks were the national runners-up in the 1995 NCAA tournament, losing to UCLA in the championship game, 89–78.

Roster

Schedule and results

|-
!colspan=9 style=| Regular Season

|-
!colspan=9 style=| SEC Tournament

|-
!colspan=9 style=| NCAA Tournament

Sources

Rankings

Awards and honors
Corliss Williamson, SEC Men's Basketball Player of the Year
Corliss Williamson, Second Team, 1995 NCAA Men's Basketball All-Americans
Corliss Williamson, 1st team All-SEC
Scotty Thurman, AP Honorable Mention, 1995 NCAA Men's Basketball All-Americans
Scotty Thurman, 1st team All-SEC

Team players drafted into the NBA

References

Arkansas Razorbacks men's basketball seasons
NCAA Division I men's basketball tournament Final Four seasons
Arkansas
Arkansas
Razor
Razor